Programming languages and platforms that typically support reflection include dynamically typed languages such as Smalltalk, Perl, PHP, Python, VBScript, and JavaScript. Also the .NET Languages are supported and the Maude system of rewriting logic. Very rarely there are some non-dynamic or unmanaged languages, notable examples being Delphi, eC and Objective-C.

APL
Befunge
BlitzMax
ColdFusion MX
Curl
D
Delphi
eC
ECMAScript a.k.a. ActionScript, JavaScript, JScript
Eiffel
Factor
Forth
Go
Io
Java (see java.lang.reflect)
Java virtual machine
Julia
Lisp
Logo
Logtalk
Lua
Mathematica
Maude system
.NET Common Language Runtime
C#
F#
Visual Basic .NET
Delphi (.NET variant)
Windows PowerShell
Oberon
Object Pascal
Perl
PHP
Pico
PL/SQL
POP-11
Poplog
Prolog
Python
R
REBOL
Ruby
Scheme
Smalltalk
Pharo
Bistro
Squeak
Self
SuperCollider
Snobol
Tcl
XOTcl
Visual FoxPro
 Xojo
 Wolfram Language

Lists of programming languages